God's Equation is the fourth album by the Norwegian progressive metal band Pagan's Mind. It was released on 9 November 2007 in Europe and on 15 January 2008 in the US.

The 2-disc limited edition version of the album contains a poster, including six bonus tracks, a video clip and wallpapers in a paperboard slipcase.

Track listing

Credits

Band members 
 Nils K. Rue − Vocals
 Jørn Viggo Lofstad − Guitars
 Steinar Krokmo − Bass
 Stian Kristoffersen − Drums
 Ronny Tegner − Keyboards

Other 
 "God's Equation" was mixed by Stefan Glaumann (of Rammstein) in Toytown Studios, Sweden.

References 

2007 albums
Pagan's Mind albums
Limb Music albums